Węgrzce may refer to the following places in Poland:
Węgrzce, Lower Silesian Voivodeship (south-west Poland)
Węgrzce, Lesser Poland Voivodeship (south Poland)